In the sport of association football, each of the 11 players on a team is assigned to a particular position on the field of play. A team is made up of one goalkeeper and ten outfield players who fill various defensive, midfield, and attacking positions depending on the formation deployed. These positions describe both the player's main role and their area of operation on the pitch.

In the early development of the game, formations were much more offensively aggressive, with the 1–2–7 being prominent in the late 1800s. In the latter part of the 19th century, the 2–3–5 formation became widely used and the position names became more refined to reflect this. In defence, there were full-backs, known as the left-back and right-back; in midfield, left-half, centre-half and right-half; and for the forward line there were outside-left (or left wing), inside-left, centre-forward, inside-right and outside-right (or right wing). As the game has evolved, tactics and team formations have changed and so many of the names of the positions have changed to reflect their duties in the modern game (though some old familiar ones remain). The term "half-back" fell out of use by the early 1970s and "midfield" was used in naming the positions that play around the middle third as in centre midfield and wide midfield.

The fluid nature of the modern game means that positions in football are not as rigidly defined as in sports such as rugby or American football. Even so, most players will play in a limited range of positions throughout their career, as each position requires a particular set of skills and physical attributes. Footballers who are able to play comfortably in a number of positions are referred to as "utility players".

However, in Total Football tactics, the players are only loosely defined into a position. This tactic required players who were extremely versatile, such as Johan Cruyff, who could play every position on the pitch apart from goalkeeper.

Goalkeeper

Goalkeeper is the most defensive position in football. The goalkeeper's main job is to stop the other team from scoring by catching, palming or punching the ball from shots, headers and crosses. Unlike their teammates, goalkeepers typically remain in and around their own penalty area for most of the game. As a result, goalkeepers have a better view of the pitch and often give advice to their defence when the other team is on the attack or during set pieces. Goalkeepers are the only players on the pitch who are allowed to handle the ball, but this is restricted to their own penalty area. Positioning is another important job and is one of the hardest to master as keeper.

Goalkeepers must also wear a different coloured kit from the outfielders and officials. Common colours include yellow, green, grey, black and shades of blue. Since the 1970s, goalkeepers have also typically worn specialised gloves. They provide better grip on the ball and protect their hands from hard shots and headers, as well making it easier to punch or push the ball away. Caps were common between the 1910s and 1960s, as well as woolly jumpers, but these are not worn in any professional or semi-professional context today.

Unlike the other positions the goalkeeper is the only required role in a football match.  If a goalkeeper gets sent off or injured another goalkeeper must take their place in goal.  If that is not possible an outfielder must do so and wear the goalkeeper's shirt.

Defender

Defenders play behind the midfielders and their primary responsibility is to provide support to the team and to prevent the opposition from scoring a goal. They usually remain in the half of the field that contains the goal they are defending. Taller defenders will move forward to the opposing team's penalty box when their team takes corner kicks or free kicks, where scoring with one's head is a possibility.

Centre-back
The principal role of the centre-back, (or central defender) (historically called a centre-half) is to block the opponent's players from scoring, and safely clearing the ball from the defensive half's penalty area. As their name suggests, they play in a central position. Most teams employ two centre-backs, stationed in front of the goalkeeper. There are two main defensive strategies used by centre-backs: the zonal defence, where each centre-back covers a specific area of the pitch, and man-to-man marking, where each centre-back has the job of covering a particular opposition player.

Centre-backs are often tall, strong and have good jumping, heading and tackling ability. Successful centre-backs also need to be able to concentrate, read the game well, and be brave and decisive in making last-ditch tackles on attacking players who might otherwise be through on goal. Sometimes, particularly in lower leagues, centre-backs concentrate less on ball control and passing, preferring simply to clear the ball in a "safety-first" fashion. However, there is a long tradition of centre-backs having more than just rudimentary footballing skill, enabling a more possession-oriented playing style.

Centre-backs will usually go forward for set piece corners and free-kicks, where their height and jumping ability give them an aerial goal threat, while defensive duties are covered by the full-backs. Once the set piece is complete, they will retreat to their own half.

The position is sometimes referred to as "centre-half". This originates the late part of the 19th century, when most teams employed the 2–3–5 formation, the row of three players were called half-backs. As formations evolved, the central player in this trio (the centre-half), moved into a more defensive position on the field, taking the name of the position with them.

Sweeper
The sweeper (or libero) is a more versatile type of centre-back that, as the name suggests, "sweeps up" the ball if the opponent manages to breach the defensive line. Their position is rather more fluid than other defenders who mark their designated opponents. The sweeper's ability to read the game is even more vital than for a centre-back. The catenaccio system of play, used in Italian football in the 1960s, notably employed a defensive libero. With the advent of the modern offside rule came the need to hold more of a defensive line to catch opposing players offside. Use of a sweeper role became less popular as the last man can play an attacking opponent onside, which could in the case of the sweeper be behind the main defence.

Former German captain Franz Beckenbauer is commonly seen as the inventor of the libero and the best player in the role. However, players such as Velibor Vasović and Armando Picchi were prominent sweepers prior to Beckenbauer. Some of the greatest sweepers were Gaetano Scirea, Bobby Moore, Franco Baresi, Daniel Passarella and Lothar Matthäus.

Full-back
The left-back and the right-back (generally referred to as the full-backs) are the defenders stationed at either side of the centre-backs to provide protection from attacking wide players. They often have to defend against the opponent's wingers, who will try to take the ball past them down the flanks in order to cross or pass into the penalty area to their attackers. Full-backs traditionally do not go up to support the attack but may move up as far as the halfway line depending on the defensive line being held. In the modern game, there has been the tendency to prefer the use of the attacking full-back (wing-back) role though they are more often than not still referred to as right- or left-backs.

Originally, a full-back was the last line of defence, but as the game developed in the early 20th century, the centre-half role was dropped backwards and came to be known as 'centre-back', and the full-backs were then pushed out wider to create the right-back and left-back positions.

Wing-back
The wing-backs (or attacking full-backs) are defenders with a more advanced emphasis on attack. The name is a portmanteau of "winger" and "full-back", indicating greater emphasis on their responsibilities in attack. They are usually employed as part of a 3–5–2 formation, and can therefore be considered part of the midfield when a team is attacking. They may also be used in a 5–3–2 formation and therefore have a more defensive role. The term "wing-back" itself is gradually falling out of use as there is less of a distinction with the full-back roles in the modern game, especially when used in a 4–3–3 or 4–2–3–1 formation.

The wing-back role is one of the most physically demanding positions in modern football. Wing-backs are often more adventurous than traditional full-backs and are expected to provide width, especially in teams without wingers. A wing-back needs to be of exceptional stamina, be able to provide crosses upfield and then defend effectively against an opponent's attack down the flanks. A defensive midfielder is usually fielded to cover the advances of an opponent's wing-back.

Midfielder

Midfielders (originally called half-backs) are players whose position of play is midway between the attacking forwards and the defenders. Their main duties are to maintain possession of the ball, taking the ball from defenders and feeding it to the strikers, as well as dispossessing opposing players. Most managers field at least one central midfielder with a marked task of breaking up opposition's attacks while the rest are more adept to creating goals or have equal responsibilities between attack and defence. Midfielders can be expected to cover many areas of a pitch, as at times they can be called back into defence or required to attack with the strikers. They are more often the players that initiate attacking play for a team.

Central midfielder
The central midfielder provides a link between defence and attack, fulfilling a number of duties and operating primarily in the middle third of the pitch. They will support their team's attacking play and endeavour to win the ball back on defense.  A central midfielder is often an important initiator of attacks and can be sometimes described as a "playmaker." They will also offer an additional line of defence when the team is under sustained attack and when defending set pieces. Central midfielders are always busy in a game and are therefore sometimes described as the engine room of the team.

Their central position enables them to have an all-round view of the match.  Since most of the action takes place in and around their area of the pitch, midfielders often exert the greatest degree of control over how a match is played. It is often said that a match is won or lost in midfield, meaning that whichever team dominates the middle area of the pitch is able to dictate the game. A central midfielder is expected to have good vision, be adept at long and short passing and have great stamina because of the ground they cover in a game. They also need to be good at tackling to win the ball back.

Over time two additional central midfield roles have developed from the standard role, though their duties have a degree of overlap. These are the attacking midfield and defensive midfield roles and are explained in the sections below. Depending on the team's tactics a combination of all three roles may be deployed in midfield. Sometimes a central midfielder will be used in a wide midfield role to provide width or as cover.

Defensive midfielder
A defensive midfielder (holding midfielder or midfield anchor) is a central midfielder who is stationed in front of the defenders to provide more defensive protection, thus "holding back" when the rest of the midfield supports the attack. The defensive midfielder screens the defence by harrying and tackling the opposition teams' attackers and defenders. They also help tactically, for instance, by directing opposing attacking players out to the wing where they have more limited influence, and by covering the positions of full-backs, other midfielders and even the centre-backs if they charge up to support the attack. 

Although the duties of defensive midfielders are primarily defensive, some midfielders are deployed as deep-lying playmakers, due to their ability to dictate tempo from a deep position with their passing. Sometimes a defensive midfielder will be paired with a central midfielder who will act as the deep-lying playmaker. Whenever the central midfielder ventures forward the defensive midfielder will hold back.

Defensive midfielders require good positional sense, work rate, tackling ability, and anticipation (of player and ball movement) to excel. They also need to possess good passing skills and close control to hold the ball in midfield under sustained pressure. Most importantly, defensive midfielders require great stamina as they are the outfield players who cover the greatest distance during a professional match. In top football clubs, a midfielder may cover up to 12 kilometres for a full 90-minute game. Deep-lying playmakers typically require a good first touch under opposition pressure and the ability to play long crossfield passes to attacking players further upfield.

Attacking midfielder

An attacking midfielder is a midfield player who is positioned in an advanced midfield position, usually between central midfield and the team's forwards, and who has a primarily offensive role.

According to positioning along the field, attacking midfield may be divided into left, right and central attacking midfield roles. A central attacking midfielder may be referred to as a playmaker, or number ten (due to the association of the number 10 shirt with this position).

These players typically serve as the offensive pivot of the team, and are sometimes said to be "playing in the hole", although this term can also be used to describe the positioning of a deep-lying forward. Their main role is to create goal-scoring opportunities using superior vision, control, and technical skill.
The attacking midfielder is an important position that requires the player to possess superior technical abilities in terms of passing and, perhaps more importantly, the ability to read the opposing defence in order to deliver defence-splitting passes to the strikers; in addition to their technical and creative ability, they are also usually quick, agile, and mobile players, which aids them in beating opponents during dribbling runs.

Some attacking midfielders are called trequartistas or fantasisti (i.e. a playmaker between the forwards and the midfield), known for their deft touch, vision, ability to shoot from range, and passing prowess.However, not all attacking midfielders are trequartistas – some attacking midfielders are very vertical and are essentially auxiliary attackers, i.e. secondary striker.
In Brazil, the offensive playmaker is known as the "meia atacante", whereas in Argentina, it is known as the "enganche".

Wide midfielder
A wide midfielder (left midfield and right midfield, or generally side midfielder) (historically called left-half and right-half, or wing-half) is a midfielder who is stationed to the left or right of central midfield. Though they are often referred to as wingers, not all players in these positions are stereotypical speedy, touchline hugging players. With the advent of the modern game the traditional outside forwards known as "wingers" were pushed back to wide midfield, though still commonly referred to as wingers. As the game has developed further, some tactical formations (for example, 4–3–3) have used central midfielders deployed in a wider position to provide width, more defensive protection along the flanks and to help compress play in the opponent's half. They will still support attacking play and sometimes be expected to act as a semi-winger.

Forward

Forwards (or strikers) are players who are positioned nearest to the opposing team's goal. The primary responsibility of forwards is to score goals and to create scoring chances for other players. Forwards may also contribute defensively by harrying opposition defenders and goalkeepers whilst not in possession. The most common modern formations include between one and three forwards; for example, a lone striker in a 4–2–3–1, paired strikers in a 4–4–2 or a striker and two wingers in a 4–3–3.

Coaches will often field one striker who plays on the shoulder of the last opposing defender and another attacking forward who plays somewhat deeper and assists in creating goals as well as scoring. The former is sometimes a large striker, typically known as a "target man", who is used either to distract opposing defenders to help teammates score, or to score himself; the latter is usually of quicker pace, and is required to have some abilities like finding holes in the opposing defence and, sometimes, dribbling. In other cases, strikers will operate on the wings of the field and work their way goalwards. Yet another variation is the replacement of the target man with a striker who can thread through-balls.

Players who specialise in playing as a target are usually of above-average height with good heading ability and an accurate shot. They tend to be the "outlet" player for both midfielders and defenders, able to "hold the ball up" (retain possession of the ball in an advanced position while teammates run forward to join the attack). They tend to score goals from crosses, often with the head, and can use their body strength to shield the ball while turning to score.

Other forwards may rely on their pace to run onto long balls passed over or through the opposition defence, rather than collecting the ball with their back to goal like a target man. Some forwards can play both of these roles equally well.

Second striker
The second striker has a long history in the game, but the terminology to describe them has varied over the years. Originally such players were termed inside forwards. More recently, the preferred terms have been second striker, support striker, deep-lying forward, shadow striker, or withdrawn striker, and are often referred to as playing "in the hole" (i.e. the space between the midfield and the defence of the opposing team). Second strikers tend not to be as tall or as physically imposing as a centre forward. They are required to be more "nippy", quick, mobile, and skillful, helping to create goals and scoring opportunities for centre forwards, utilising spaces created in the opposition's defence to provide passes to the strikers, picking up loose balls around the area, or attempting to dribble with the ball and score themselves.

The position was initially developed by the famous Hungary national team of the late 1940s and mid-1950s led by Ferenc Puskás. Later, it was popularised in Italian football as the trequartista ("three-quarters") or fantasista, the advanced playmaker who plays neither in midfield nor as a forward, but effectively pulls the strings for his team's attack, and serves as an assist provider. Many players in this position can play in a free role, as an attacking midfielder or sometimes on the wing. The position has also been known as the number 10 role, as many players who played in this position wore the number 10 jersey.

Whatever the terminology, the position itself is a loosely defined one, a player who lies somewhere between the out-and-out striker and the midfield, who can perform this role effectively due to their vision, technical skills, creativity, and passing ability. Such a player is either a skillful, attack-minded midfielder or a creative striker who can both score and create opportunities for centre forwards, although a second striker will often not be involved in build-up plays as much as an attacking midfielder. As the supporting forward role was popularised in Italy due to free-role attacking midfielders adapting to a more advanced position in the tactically rigorous 4–4–2 formations of the 1990s, their defensive contribution is also usually higher than that of a pure number ten playmaker. In Italy, this role is also known as a "rifinitore" or "seconda punta", whereas in Brazil, it is known as a "ponte de lança".

Centre forward
A centre forward has the key task of scoring goals and for this reason acts as the focal point of the majority of attacking play by a team. As such, how well a striker is performing tends to be measured purely on goals scored despite the fact that they may be contributing in other ways to a team's success. A traditional centre forward was required to be tall in height and strong physically in order to be able to win the ball in the area from crosses and attempt to score with either their feet or head, or to knock the ball down for a teammate to score. Whilst these assets are still an advantage, in the modern game speed and movement are also required as there is more interplay when attacking. In a 4–4–2 or 4–4–1–1 formation the centre forward is often paired with a second striker who may play around him or in a slightly withdrawn role respectively, though it is not unknown to play two recognised centre forwards.

Sometimes a team may opt on a more defensive formation such as 4–5–1 in which the centre forward is required to play a "lone role" up front. In these cases a team may look for opportunities to counter-attack on the break and the centre forward may find himself attacking the goal on his own with just a defender to beat or alternatively he may hold the ball up in the opponent's half to allow other players to join in the attack. Modern footballing tactics have made more use of 4–3–3 and 4–2–3–1 formations. Here the centre forward may be involved more with the attacking build up play, supported by wingers (who often come infield) and attacking midfielders. The play uses more shorter, quick passes with movement off the ball, looking to create an opening on goal.

Winger
A winger (left winger and right winger) (historically called outside-left and outside-right, or outside forward) is an attacking player who is stationed in a wide position near the touchlines. They can be classified as forwards, considering their origin as the old outside forward who played out on the "wing" (i.e. side of the pitch). They continue to be termed as such in many parts of the world, especially in Latin and Dutch footballing cultures. However, in the English-speaking world, they are usually counted as part of the midfield having been pushed back there with the advent of the 4–4–2 formation which gradually rose to prominence in the 1960s, given the role's additional defensive duties. A winger's main attribute is usually speed which is used to attack and dribble past opponent's full-backs in order to get behind the defence and to then deliver crosses and passes into the centre for their attackers. Occasionally left and right footed wingers may swap sides of the field as a tactical move to enable the winger to cut inside against the opposing full-back's weaker foot, looking for a shooting opportunity or just as a means of opening up the defence. Clubs such as Barcelona and Real Madrid often choose to play their wingers on the 'wrong' flank for this reason.

Although wingers are a familiar part of football, the use of wingers is by no means universal, and many successful teams have operated without wingers. At the 1966 World Cup, England manager Alf Ramsey led a team without natural wingers to the title; this was unusual enough at the time for the team to be nicknamed "The Wingless Wonders". A more recent example is that of Italian club Milan, who have typically played in a narrow midfield diamond formation or in a "Christmas tree" formation (4–3–2–1), relying on attacking full-backs to provide the necessary width down the wings.

Player styles

Goalkeeper
Shot stopper  A goalkeeper known as being very good at saving strikes on goal, many at point blank range. They are known for having great reactions, an almost instinctive ability to anticipate where to position themselves and to dive or spread themselves in order to effect a save, often from a shot that may look impossible to prevent going in. They can be recognized by a high saves to shots ratio.
Sweeper-keeper  With the advent of the offside rule, the role of a sweeping defender or libero has become pretty much obsolete. However, in the last decades it has become popular for goalkeepers to take that role instead. A sweeping goalkeeper is good at reading the game, and prevents scoring opportunities by coming off his/her line to challenge and/or distract opposing forwards who have beaten the offside trap. Manuel Neuer has often been described as a sweeper-keeper.

Defensive
Attacking full-back  The attacking full-back (or wing-back) is a defender stationed on the flank with emphasis on attack as well as defense. The name wing-back is a portmanteau of "winger" (see above) and "full-back". As the role combines that of the winger and the full-back, attacking full-backs need to have good stamina. Where a team fields three centre-backs, the attacking full-back is expected to concentrate more on providing support for strikers than concentrating on their defensive duties.

Libero  The libero (Italian for "free") or sweeper is a more versatile type of defender that sweeps up the ball if the opponent manages to break the defensive line. Their position is rather more fluid than other defenders who mark their designated opponents. Sweepers are usually faster than that of the other players on the team, and are built slightly smaller than the others. The sweeper's ability to read the game is even more vital than for a centre-back; they also are usually confident on the ball and possess good passing and vision, as they are often responsible for starting plays from the back-line. The catenaccio system of play, used in Italian football in the 1960s, notably employed a defensive libero. Franz Beckenbauer is often credited as having invented the role of the modern sweeper.

Stopper  Stoppers are skilled defenders who rely on their strength, stamina, and man-marking abilities to stop the opposition's attacking play by making strong tackles. They are usually uncompromising in their tackling and would rather give away a foul than let an opposition player get past them. Stoppers generally play as centre-backs.

Midfield
Ball winner  A ball winner is a kind of midfielder that is adept at winning the ball back from the opposition through tackling and interceptions in the midfield area of the pitch. They endeavour to break up the opposition's attacking play by regaining possession. Ball winners are usually defensive midfielders or central midfielders but this can also be an attribute of a defender.

Defensive midfielder  Defensive midfielders are central midfield players that focus more on defence than attack. They need strength to make strong tackles and they also need stamina and some degree of passing skill as they need to support other midfielders.

Creative midfielder  Creative midfielders are midfield players that often create goal-scoring opportunities for the team in situations where nothing seems likely. They usually have good ball control, dribbling and passing ability and movement and will be blessed with vision and on-the-ball intelligence. They are usually attacking midfielders, though second strikers, wingers, and central midfielders can also be known as creative players.

Box-to-box  Box-to-box midfielders are often involved in almost all aspects of the game. They need immense stamina as they need to cover most areas of the pitch, as well as some degree of passing skills. They would be up one end of the pitch assisting the attack one moment then back helping to defend around their own penalty area the next. They normally play as central midfielders but any of the midfield players may have this attribute.

Wide midfielder/wide playmaker  These are midfielders that have pace and/or skills to be able to beat defenders along the flank. They will have the habit of running wide whenever they get possession of the ball or when their team is attacking, to receive the ball. Their most important skill is to be able to cross the ball into the penalty box to create opportunities for strikers. Sometimes strikers will pull right or left as a tactic to draw a defender out of position or to get into unmarked space.

Playmaker  Playmakers are midfielders that control the flow of attacking play, starting off attacking moves. They have good passing ability and also good off-the-ball ability and vision to be able to read the game and to see where goal-scoring opportunities may come from. Playmakers are commonly central midfielders or attacking midfielders. Defensive midfielders are also used as playmakers; this is commonly referred to as deep-lying playmakers, which indicates that their playmaking abilities are mainly assigned to the responsibility of managing play from the own half of the pitch.

Attacking
Dribbler  Dribblers are attacking players known for their close ball control ability that is used to go past defenders by sudden change of direction and acceleration sometimes combined with great pace. The skill is used to create opportunities for other attackers or to score themselves having broken through the opposition's defence using what is sometimes referred to as "trickery". One of the great spectator sights in football is a player going on a "mazy run" with the ball, twisting and turning to avoid opposition tackles, beating a number of players. 

Counterattacker  Counterattackers are any attacking player that uses their pace to beat defenders and cause unexpected scoring opportunities at any time. They also need some degree of shooting skill. Counterattacking opportunities occur when the opposition are themselves attacking a team with most of their players forward. A counterattack happens when the ball is won back and is quickly played into space for a counterattacking player to run onto or where a player takes the ball themselves and runs with pace into a sparsely defended opposition half.

Clinical finisher  Clinical finishers are forwards that specialise in their accurate shooting ability. They are "clinical" in that they need few opportunities to score a goal being able to strike and place the ball exactly where it will beat the goalkeeper. They can be identified by their high goal to shots ratio. Clinical strikers usually play as centre forwards though other attacking players can often be said to be clinical finishers.

Target man  Target men are strikers or central forwards that generally have a high degree of physical strength and are usually tall in height. They are able to make space, score goals, or hold up play with the ball waiting for support no matter how much pressure defenders are putting on them. They specialise in taking and controlling the ball in the air or along the ground often from long passes, strength to hold off defenders when receiving long passes and sometimes volleying the ball.

Goal poacher  Goal poachers are forwards who wait in the six-yard box or the penalty area for a cross, pass or loose ball and pounce to try to score a goal. Their "poaching" refers to the fact that they will often score a goal out of the slightest of opportunities i.e. steal a goal. Goal poachers usually play as centre forwards or second strikers.

False nine  A false nine is a player who appears to be playing as a centre-forward (traditionally in a number nine shirt), but drops deep or pulls wide disrupting the opposing team's marking. Usually the centre-forward will be marked by one of the centre-backs but the false nine will often move away into a neutral area causing a dilemma as to whether the centre-back follows (isolating himself from the other centre-back) or stays where he is, making himself redundant.

Tactical evolution

1–2–7 formation
 In the sport's early days, football was very much focused on attack and, as such, many teams (such as Royal Engineers, 1872) played with a 1–2–7 formation (one defender, two midfielders and seven attackers). The single defender was known as the three-quarter-back, and he was supported in part by two half-backs from midfield who would be in charge of orchestrating the game with short passing. Up front, the seven forwards were split into four wing forwards and three centre forwards. The wingers' main task was to use their pace to pick up on the long balls sent forward by the half- and three-quarter-backs, whereas the centre forwards were charged with taking the short passes from the half-backs.

2–3–5 formation 
In order to combat the short-passing threat, the championship-winning Preston North End side of 1888–89 devised a more defensive 2–3–5 formation (two defenders, three midfielders and five attackers), which would become the standard formation for many teams for the best part of the next 40 years. One of the half-backs was brought back into defence, which sat deeper than before, making the two defenders full-backs as opposed to three-quarter-backs. Their main job was to mark the opposition's inside forwards and cut out the short passes in mid-field. Furthermore, two forwards were brought back into midfield as half-backs to mark the opposition wingers and negate the pace threat. The remaining half-back became a centre-half, who would patrol the field, drifting from defence to attack as he saw fit. This left two wingers up front (outside right and outside left), along with two inside forwards (inside right and inside left) and a centre-forward.

WM formation 
 Up until this point, for an attacking player to be onside, there had to be at least three opposing players closer to their goal line than the attacker. In the 1920s, the offside rule was changed so that only two opposing players were required between the attacker and the goal-line for the attacker to still be onside. This made it easier for attackers to score against the two-man defences of the day. To combat this, Arsenal manager Herbert Chapman devised a system that utilised three defenders as opposed to the usual two. This system was complemented by a strict man-marking regime, whereby the centre-half – who had now retreated to the centre of the three man defence – would stick as close to the opposing centre-forward as possible, while the full-backs – who had moved further wide to accommodate the centre-back – would mark the wingers. This left two mid-fielders in a slightly less advanced position than before to act as wing-halves who would have the dual responsibility of loosely marking the inside forwards and providing the forwards with the ball. This was helped by the slight withdrawal of the inside forwards from the front line. Chapman's formation was referred to as the WM formation due to its appearance on the field with all the players in their described positions;. in modern terminology it may be referred to as 3–2–5 or 3–2–2–3.

MM formation 
 A variation of the WM formation was the MM formation (also known as the WW formation) used to great effect by the Hungary national team against England in 1953, when they became the first non-British side to beat England at the old Wembley Stadium. This formation was so called because of the deep-lying centre-forward Nándor Hidegkuti, used to draw the opposition centre-back out of position, leaving plenty of space between the full-backs for the inside-forwards Ferenc Puskás and Sándor Kocsis to exploit.

3–3–4 formation 
 During the 1950s and 1960s the WM formation developed into the 3–3–4 formation and was used by many successful teams. This formation focused on using a midfield playmaker, through whom all the attacking play was funnelled. More recently this formation has been used by Antonio Conte who won the Italian national League with Juventus, using two wide players Stephan Lichtsteiner and Kwadwo Asamoah to get up and down the pitch quickly.

Flat back four 
 In 1958, the Brazil national team won their first of five World Cups to date thanks to the "flat back four" (4–2–4) system they had developed to counter the Hungarians' M–U. Two centre-backs would mark the inside-forwards' runs from deep, while the wider full-backs would not only cut out the threat of the opposing wingers but also provide width on the counter-attack. The relative lack of numbers in the middle of the park meant a creative presence was required, and for the Brazilians, that presence was provided in the form of their dazzling midfielder Didi. Also in Mario Zagallo they had a left winger years ahead of his time, proficient at funnelling back and helping out the midfield when the team lost possession.

4–3–3 formation 
 By 1962, the Brazilian 4–2–4 formation evolved into an asymmetrical 4–3–3, with Mario Zagallo now playing as a left wide midfielder instead of a left defensive outside forward/winger.

Italian catenaccio system 
 The advent of the Italian "catenaccio" (bolt) system came soon after, and was a more defensive variation on the Brazilians' 4–2–4 system. Two forwards were withdrawn to leave just two up front, and an extra midfielder was added to bolster the midfield. However, the major tactical innovation with this formation was the floating sweeper, often referred to in Italian as a "libero", or "free man". While the four main defenders would have the task of strict man-marking the opposition forwards, the libero would act as a sponge, mopping up any attacks that might happen to get through the tight defence. Franz Beckenbauer of Bayern Munich gave the position a more attacking role and played a major part as captain of the West Germany national side that won the World Cup in 1974 and came third in 1970.

4–4–2 formation 
 Meanwhile, in the United Kingdom the 4–4–2 formation rose to prominence in the 1960s. The English also developed a tactical formation that looked like a 4–4–2 (more accurately 4–1–3–2) but switched to 4–2–4 or 4–3–3 depending on how they attacked. The flat back four that had become so popular remained intact, but the midfield was a free-flowing unit with players given license to attack as the scenario saw fit. In defence, using the 1966 World Cup side as an example, Martin Peters, Bobby Charlton and Alan Ball would all stay back to counter the opposition attack. However, in attack they had two options: Peters and Ball could charge forward, creating problems for the opposition out wide with their pace and crossing ability, creating either a 4–2–4 formation or a 3–3–4 formation when one of the full-backs pushed forward; or Charlton could burst through the middle of the strike partnership of Roger Hunt and Geoff Hurst and overload the centre of the opposition defence in a 4–3–3, providing either an extra man in the box or an effective long-shot alternative. The unsung hero of Alf Ramsey's England side was Nobby Stiles, who was the midfield linchpin, whom the team relied on in defence when Charlton surged forward in support of the strikers.

Dutch "total football" 
 The 1970s saw the coming of the Dutch "total football" scheme. While not burdened with a specific, rigid formation, the system relied on extremely versatile utility players who were able to fill in at any position the circumstances of the game required them to. One such player was the legendary Johan Cruyff, who epitomised the total football ideology by being able to play in almost every outfield position. A major criticism of this style of play was that, for the Dutch national side, it never yielded a major trophy, though it did help them to reach two consecutive World Cup finals (1974 and 1978). The argument is somewhat negated by the fact that the Ajax side that Cruyff played in won three consecutive European Cup titles in the early to mid-1970s.

3–5–2 formation 
 At the 1986 FIFA World Cup, Argentina's Carlos Bilardo unveiled a 3–5–2 formation (or perhaps, more precisely, 3–5–1–1), as his playmaker, Diego Maradona, also operated as a second striker playing in the "hole".

4–4–2 variation 
 The last major tactical evolution occurred in the late 1980s and early 1990s, when the Milan side played with a variation on the 4–4–2 formation. This formation relied extensively on the four defenders' ability to work as a unit in order to spring the offside trap on slower attackers, as well as the stamina of the midfielders who would be expected to pressure the opposition as soon as they gained possession of the ball. In attack, the team would play short passes within the midfield, using their crisp passing and dynamic movement to open up holes in the defence and create attacking opportunities.

4–2–3–1 formation 
 The 2010 World Cup confirmed a general shift toward a broadly counter-attacking, reactive 4–2–3–1 formation by the tournament's more successful teams. Indeed, of the four semi-finalists in that tournament, all but Uruguay employed some variation of this tactic. This shape tends to utilise fluid movement between the four wing players, with full-backs expected to provide plenty of support to the wingers in front of them. Following the World Cup, most of the world's major leagues have seen this tactic being used by an increasing number of teams.

5–3–2 formation 
 A formation used by most Italian teams, that became a popular choice among the teams that participated in the 2014 World Cup. Louis van Gaal's Holland and Miguel Herrera's Mexico were among the World Cup teams that used some variation of the 5–3–2 formation.

See also
Association football formations
Association football tactics
Bandy, a hockey sport in which much the same positions are used as in association football

References

Further reading
 Science of winning soccer: Emergent pattern-forming dynamics in association football. Journal of Systems Science and Complexity, Vol. 26, 2013 p. 73–84